Phacelia linearis, the linear-leaved phacelia or threadleaf phacelia, is a species of phacelia. It is native to western North America from western Canada to Wyoming to northern California, where it grows in forest, woodland, open scrub, and other habitat. It prefers sandy soils.

Description
It is coated in soft or stiff hairs. The leaves are linear or lance-shaped and sometimes divided into several narrow, pointed lobes. The hairy inflorescence is a one-sided curving or coiling cyme of bell-shaped flowers. Each flower is up to 1 cm long and light purple in color with fused petals forming a paler tubular throat; they have five stamens. Flowers bloom April to June.

References

External links
Jepson Manual Treatment - Phacelia linearis
Washington Burke Museum
Phacelia linearis - Photo gallery

linearis
Flora of the West Coast of the United States
Flora of the Western United States
Flora of the Northwestern United States
Flora of Nevada
Flora of California
Flora of Washington (state)
Flora of Wyoming
Flora of Oregon
Flora of Idaho
Flora of South Dakota
Flora of Canada
Flora without expected TNC conservation status